Como 1907, commonly referred to as Como, is an Italian football club based in Como, Lombardy, Italy. The club currently plays in Serie B, the second tier of Italian football, following promotion from the 2020–21 Serie C season. The club was founded in 1907 and the team's colour is royal blue.

Como were in Serie A in 2002–03; this was followed by three consecutive relegations culminating in demotion to Serie C2 at the end of the 2004–05 following a playoff (2–1 on aggregate) with Novara Calcio. Financially overstretched they were declared bankrupt and excluded from participation in Italian professional football. They were immediately admitted to Serie D, the top level of non-professional football in Italy, where they spent three seasons before earning promotion back to Serie C2 in the 2007–08 season. After a further bankruptcy in 2016, a new company re-founded the club in 2017 and was admitted to Serie D for the 2017–18 season.

History
Como were first promoted to Serie A in 1949 and enjoyed a respectable four-year stay before relegation, the next 20 years were spent moving between Serie B and C but more often the former. A revival in the 1970s saw the club emerge as contenders for promotion to Serie A, this was achieved in 1975, but despite the best efforts of players such as Alessandro Scanziani they would last only a season. They would slump to C1 by 1978, but with a rebuilt team containing stars like Pietro Vierchowod would achieve successive promotions and a two-year stay in Serie A (1980–82).

Como managed another promotion to the top flight in 1984, with a five-year stint in Serie A proving the club's most successful period of recent times. The strikeforce of Dan Corneliusson and Stefano Borgonovo oversaw a 9th-place finish in 1986, which was repeated the following year with far fewer goals scored. The club's defence, led by hard man Pasquale Bruno, proved more than up to the task however. Relegation in 1989 precipitated a rapid decline, with Como spending most of the 1990s in Serie C1 with the exception of 1994–95. Former Chelsea and Tottenham goalkeeper Carlo Cudicini spent a year on loan at Como.

Bankruptcy and brief promotion to Serie B
The 21st century saw Como experience a brief revival. Promotion to Serie B in 2001 was marred by an appallingly violent incident in a game against Modena, resulting in captain Massimiliano Ferrigno being handed a three-year ban. They nonetheless managed promotion to Serie A in the 2002–03 season. However, the return to Serie A proved a major disappointment with the side in the bottom two all season, and a ban on games at the Sinigaglia after crowd violence. Successive relegations have caused financial difficulties; in December 2004 the club was declared bankrupted. No investor was successful to take over the club (as the bid from Preziosi was denied) thus the company "Calcio Como S.p.A." was liquidated. Thanks to FIGC regulation, a new entity Calcio Como S.r.l. was allowed to admit into 2005–06 Serie D. The liquidator also found former chairman Enrico Preziosi had transferred some assets such as the contracts of the players to his new club Genoa, causing the financial failure of Como. They returned to the rebranded Serie C2, Lega Pro Seconda Divisione in 2008, after having won the Girone B of Serie D. Como finally returned to Serie C1 (Lega Pro Prima Divisione) after promotion play-offs after defeating Rodengo Saiano with 1–1 aggregate and Alessandria with 4–1 aggregate. In 2015, Como finished fourth in the third-tier, now called Lega Pro. They qualified for the promotion play-offs and earned promotion to Serie B after beating Bassano Virtus in the two-legged final 2–0 on aggregate. They were relegated back down to Lega Pro the following season.

F.C. Como / Como 1907
New economic problems arose in the 2016–17 season, forcing the club to be declared out of business and put on auction. At the fourth auction, the assets of the club were acquired by Akosua Puni Essien, wife of the Ghanaian footballer Michael Essien and first foreign businesswoman in Italian football (via her company F.C. Como S.r.l.).

However, Italian Football Federation (FIGC) rejected the application of F.C. Como as Como's successor in 2017–18 Serie C, as the club did not fulfill all the criteria in the Article 52 of N.O.I.F. At the start of season, another company Como 1907 S.r.l. was admitted to 2017–18 Serie D instead, excising another sub-clause of the Article 52.

After winning the Round B of Serie D, Como returned to professional football in 2019.

Since 2019, the club has been owned by Indonesian company Djarum Group led by Michael Hartono and Robert Budi Hartono and sponsored by Djarum subsidiary Mola since 2021. A former Chelsea and Millwall player Dennis Wise has been appointed as president.

Players

Current squad

Other players under contract

Out on loan

Notable former players

Internationals
The following is a list of Como players that were internationals whilst playing for the team:

 Migjen Basha
 Zito Luvumbo
 Joshua Brillante (Olympics)
 Dieter Mirnegg
 Dirceu
 Milton (Olympics)
 Kristiyan Trenchev (U18, U19)
 Vedin Musić
 Doris Fuakumputu
 Stjepan Tomas
 Nicholas Ioannou
 Massimo Albiero (U21)
 Giuseppe Ambrosino (U20)
 Enrico Annoni (U21)
 Nicolò Barella (U19)
 Candido Beretta (U21)
 Stefano Borgonovo (U21)
 Nicola Corrent (U21)
 Davide Dionigi (U21)
 Roberto Galia (U21)
 Vittorio Ghiandi (U21)
 Salvatore Giunta (U21)
 Renzo Gobbo (U21)
 Aristide Guarneri (U21)
 Roberto Lorenzini (U21)
 Gianfranco Matteoli (U21)
 Marco Nicoletti (U21)
 Egidio Notaristefano (U21)
 Franco Pedroni (U21)
 Matteo Pessina (U19)
 Felice Piccolo (U21)
 Umberto Pinardi (U21)
 Simone Scuffet (U21)
 Marco Simone (U21)
 Angelo Turconi (U21)
 Pietro Vierchowod
 Amrit Bansal-McNulty (U21)
 Nikola Lazetić
 Dan Corneliusson
 Nelson Abeijón

Trofeo Borgonovo
Since 2012-13 season, an yearly trophy ìs held, at the end of every season, in order to reward Calcio Como best player or employee. The trophy is named after Stefano Borgonovo (former player of the team) and the award is organized and held by both supporters and citizenship. This trophy can be compared to a kind of company hall of fame.

Up to 2021-22 season, following were awarded:

2012-13 -  Alfredo Donnarumma
2013-14 -  Giuseppe Le Noci
2014-15 -  Simone Andrea Ganz
2015-16 -  Daniel Bessa
2017-17 -  Luca Zanotti
2017-18 -  Matteo Kucich
2018-19 -  Alessandro Gabrielloni
2019-20 -  Alberto Giughello (team doctor)
2020-21 -  Massimiliano Gatto
2021-22 -  Davide Facchin

Honours

League
Serie B
Winners: 1948–49, 1979–80, 2001–02
Serie C
Winners: 1930–31, 1967–68, 1978–79, 2020–21
Serie D
Winners: 2007–08, 2018–19

Cups
Coppa Italia Serie C
Winners: 1996–97
Coppa Italia Serie D
Winners: 2007–08

Divisional movements

References

External links

 
Football clubs in Lombardy
Association football clubs established in 1907
Italian football First Division clubs
Serie B clubs
Serie D clubs
Serie A clubs
Serie C clubs
1907 establishments in Italy
Re-established companies
Phoenix clubs (association football)
2005 establishments in Italy
2017 establishments in Italy
Coppa Italia Serie C winning clubs